The Australian Wildlife Conservancy (AWC) is an Australian independent, nonprofit organisation, working to conserve threatened wildlife and ecosystems in Australia. This is principally achieved through the acquisition of extensive areas of land on which to establish conservation reserves ("sanctuaries") or by entering into partnerships with government, Indigenous groups, and private landholders to manage landscapes for effective conservation. AWC is the largest private owner and manager of land for conservation in Australia, currently managing 31 sanctuaries and partnership sites for wildlife conservation that cover over 6.5 million hectares of land across Australia.

Australian Wildlife Conservancy operates under a unique model for conservation, using science (predominantly biodiversity survey work and targeted research) to inform on-ground land management, such as control of fire, feral animals and weeds. There is a strong focus on wildlife conservation: consequently, about 80% of all staff are based in the field and, as of 2021, 83.5% of AWC's total expenditure is invested into conservation programs.

Most funding comes from private support in the form of tax-deductible donations from the public, as well as some government grants for particular purposes, such as from the Australian government's National Reserve System Program.

Australian Wildlife Conservancy was founded in response to Australia's mammal extinction crisis. Over a third of the world's extinctions from the last 400 years have been from Australia, and Australia has already lost 31 species of mammal. Many of these extinctions were entirely preventable with effective conservation measures in place. The 2016 State of the Environment report suggests that, while Australia is incredibly rich in its biodiversity, it continues to suffer from unprecedented decline, despite legislation at all state and federal levels. In response, AWC protect a diverse array of habitats across a large network of sanctuaries, to protect 88% of Australia's bird species, 74% of mammals and 54% of reptile species, and 56% of amphibian species.

In June 2007, AWC announced the establishment of a corporate partnership with Optus.

In 2019, AWC partnered with Bullo River Station, which covers over 160,000 hectares in the north-west corner of the Northern Territory, near the mouth of the Victoria River. This is a unique partnership between a working pastoral property and a conservation sanctuary to generate outcomes for both wildlife and cattle. The landscape here is typical of the Eastern Kimberley, dominated by Keep River sandstone formations with rocky gorges, lush riverside vegetation and expansive tropical savannah woodland. Inventory biodiversity surveys have already identified several important species of rare and threatened wildlife, including the Gouldian finch (Erythrura gouldiae) and wyulda or scaly-tailed possum (Wyulda squamicaudata).

As of 2021, AWC's most recent project is the Western River Refuge, a project delivered in partnership with Kangaroo Island Land for Wildlife and private landholders in response to the destructive bushfires that occurred on Kangaroo Island in 2020. The Western River Refuge includes a 369-hectare feral predator-free fenced safe haven to protect the Kangaroo Island dunnart, as well as several other threatened species.

History
The origin of the organisation lies in a 1991 land purchase (of what is now Karakamia Sanctuary) by AWC's founder, Martin Copley. He established the sanctuary, constructed a feral-proof fence, cleared the area of feral animals and started re-introducing threatened mammals into this area. Karakamia is still open for public spotlight tours, where you can see small mammals such as the critically endangered woylie or brush-tailed bettong (Bettongia penicillata), tammar wallaby (Macropus eugenii), quenda and common brushtail possum. In 2001, the AWC became a public charitable organization.

In 2002, the AWC agreed to acquire four sanctuaries, Buckaringa, Dakalanta, Scotia and Yookamurra, for A$5.2m from Earth Sanctuaries Ltd (ESL), the company founded by John Wamsley.

AWC sanctuaries

 Bowra, Queensland
 Brooklyn, Queensland
 Buckaringa, South Australia
 Bullo River Station, Northern Territory
 Charnley River–Artesian Range Wildlife Sanctuary, Western Australia
 Curramore, Queensland
 Dakalanta, South Australia
 Dambimangari, Western Australia
 Faure Island, Western Australia
 Kalamurina, South Australia
 Karakamia, Western Australia
 Mallee Cliffs National Park, New South Wales
 Marion Downs, Western Australia
 Mornington, Western Australia
 Mount Gibson, Western Australia
 Mount Zero-Taravale, Queensland
 Newhaven, Northern Territory
 North Head, New South Wales
 Paruna, Western Australia
 Piccaninny Plains, Queensland

 Pungalina-Seven Emu, Northern Territory
 Scotia, New South Wales
 Tableland, Western Australia
 The Pilliga, New South Wales
 The Western River Refuge, South Australia
 Wilinggin, Western Australia
 Wongalara, Northern Territory
 Yampi Sound Training Area, Western Australia
 Yookamurra, South Australia

Source:

References

External links
 Australian Wildlife Conservancy

Non-profit organisations based in Western Australia
Nature conservation organisations based in Australia
2001 establishments in Australia
Protected area administrators of Australia